Prenatal Testosterone Transfer (also known as prenatal androgen transfer or prenatal hormone transfer) refers to the phenomenon in which testosterone synthesized by a developing male fetus transfers to one or more developing fetuses within the womb and influences development. This typically results in the partial masculinization of specific aspects of female behavior, cognition, and morphology, though some studies have found that testosterone transfer can cause an exaggerated masculinization in males. There is strong evidence supporting the occurrence of prenatal testosterone transfer in rodents and other litter-bearing species, such as pigs. When it comes to humans, studies comparing dizygotic opposite-sex and same-sex twins suggest the phenomenon may occur, though the results of these studies are often inconsistent.

Mechanisms of transfer
Testosterone is a steroid hormone; therefore it has the ability to diffuse through the amniotic fluid between fetuses. In addition, hormones can transfer among fetuses through the mother's bloodstream.

Consequences of testosterone transfer
During prenatal development, testosterone exposure is directly responsible for masculinizing the genitals and brain structures. This exposure leads to an increase in male-typical behavior.

Animal studies
Most animal studies are performed on rats or mice. In these studies, the amount of testosterone each individual fetus is exposed to depends on its intrauterine position (IUP). Each gestating fetus not at either end of the uterine horn is surrounded by either two males (2M), two females (0M), or one female and one male (1M). Development of the fetus varies widely according to its IUP.

Mice
In mice, prenatal testosterone transfer causes higher blood concentrations of testosterone in 2M females when compared to 1M or 0M females. This has a variety of consequences on later female behavior, physiology, and morphology.

Below is a table comparing physiological, morphological, and behavioral differences of 0M and 2M female mice.

Human studies
Studies involving humans often compare opposite-sex to same-sex dizygotic twins. Females of opposite-sex twin pairs are thought to have partially masculinized traits as a result of gestating along with a male. These studies test for a range of masculinized cognitive, morphological, physiological, and behavioral traits. Studies testing for differences in behavior (i.e. temperament) tend to yield inconsistent results, while those testing perception and cognition are typically more consistent. Though supporting evidence exists, whether or not prenatal testosterone transfer occurs in humans remains debatable.

Listed below are different types of opposite-sex versus same-sex twin tests used to determine whether prenatal testosterone transfer occurs in humans.

Tests of Behavior
 Sensation seeking
 Temperament
 Aggression
 Toy preference

Tests of Perception and Cognition
 Auditory system functioning: assessing otoacoustic emissions
 Expressive vocabulary
 Visio-spatial cognition: assessing mental rotation ability

Tests of Physiology and Morphology
 2nd to 4th digit ratio
 Tooth size
 Handedness
 Lateralization of language function: assessment on a dichotic listening test

References

Sex hormones
Embryology
Testosterone